Metcalf is a surname of English origin.

People with the surname "Metcalf" include

A
Arthur Metcalf (1889–1936), English footballer
Artie L. Metcalf (1929–2016), American malacologist
Arunah Metcalf (1771–1848), American politician

B
Barbara D. Metcalf (born 1941), American historian
Betty Metcalf (1921–2017), American politician
Brandon Metcalf (born 1986), American record producer
Brent Metcalf (born 1986), American wrestler
Brian Metcalf, Korean-American filmmaker
Bruce Metcalf (born 1949), American artist

C
Charles D. Metcalf (born 1933), American general
Charlotte Metcalf (born 1958), British film director
Chuck Metcalf (1931–2012), American bassist
Clell Lee Metcalf (1888–1948), American entomologist
Conger Metcalf (1914–1998), American painter

D
Dick Metcalf, American journalist
DK Metcalf (born 1997), American football player
Donald Metcalf (1929–2014), Australian physiologist
Douglas Metcalf, American clarinetist

E
Elizabeth H. Metcalf (1852–1925), American anthropologist
Eric Metcalf (born 1968), American football player

F
Fred Metcalf (1899–1975), Australian rules footballer

G
Gary Metcalf (born 1957), American organizational theorist
Geoff Metcalf, American author
George Metcalf (disambiguation), multiple people
Gilbert E. Metcalf, American economist

H
Harriet Metcalf (born 1958), American rower
Helen Adelia Rowe Metcalf (1830–1895), American academic administrator
Henry Metcalf (disambiguation), multiple people

I
Ida Martha Metcalf (1857–1952), American mathematician

J
Jack Metcalf (disambiguation), multiple people
James Metcalf (1925–2012), American sculptor
Janet Metcalf (born 1935), American politician
Janice Metcalf (born 1952), American tennis player
Jesse H. Metcalf (1860–1942), American politician
Jim Metcalf (1920–1977), American journalist
Jim Metcalf (footballer) (1898–1975), English footballer
JJ Metcalf (born 1988), British boxer
Joanne Metcalf (born 1958), American composer
Joel Hastings Metcalf (1866–1925), American astronomer
John Metcalf (disambiguation), multiple people
Jonathan Metcalf, American clerk
Joseph Metcalf III (1927–2007), American admiral

K
Keyes Metcalf (1889–1983), American librarian

L
Laurie Metcalf (born 1955), American actress
Lawrie Metcalf (1928–2017), New Zealand horticulturalist
Lee Metcalf (1911–1978), American politician
Louis Metcalf (1905–1981), American trumpeter
Luke Metcalf (born 1999), Australian rugby league footballer

M
Malcolm Metcalf (1910–1993), American athlete
Mark Metcalf (born 1946), American actor
Mark Metcalf (footballer) (born 1965), English footballer
Matthew Metcalf (born 1969), English footballer
Melissa Metcalf (born 1996), American gymnast
Michael Metcalf (1933–2018), British numismatist
Michael Metcalf (puritan) (1586–1664), English colonist
Mike Metcalf (1939–2018), English footballer
Mitch Metcalf (born 1966), American television analyst

N
Nancy Metcalf (born 1978), American volleyball player

P
Paul Metcalf (1917–1999), American writer
Peter Metcalf (born 1979), American ice hockey player
Prescott Metcalf (1813–1891), American businessman and politician

R
Ralph Metcalf (disambiguation), multiple people
Robert Metcalf (disambiguation), multiple people
Ryan Metcalf (born 1993), Scottish footballer

S
Shelby Metcalf (1930–2007), American basketball coach
Stephen Metcalf (disambiguation), multiple people
Steve Metcalf, American lobbyist

T
Terry Metcalf (born 1951), American football player
Terrence Metcalf (born 1978), American football player
Theophilus F. Metcalf (1816–1891), American farmer and politician
Theron Metcalf (1784–1875), American attorney and politician
Thomas Metcalf (disambiguation), multiple people
Tim Metcalf, Australian poet
T. Nelson Metcalf (1890–1982), American football player
Travis Metcalf (born 1982), American baseball player

V
Victor H. Metcalf (1853–1936), American politician
Victoria Metcalf, New Zealand researcher

W
Walter Metcalf (footballer) (1910–1981), English footballer
Walter Metcalf (chemist) (1918–2008), New Zealand physical chemist
Wilder Metcalf (1855–1935), American politician
Willard Metcalf (1858–1925), American painter
William Metcalf (disambiguation), multiple people
Woodbridge Metcalf (1888–1972), American forester and sailor

Z
Zeno Payne Metcalf (1885–1956), American entomologist

Fictional characters
Monk Metcalf, a character on the television series The Wire

See also
Metcalf (disambiguation), a disambiguation page for "Metcalf"
Metcalfe (surname), a page for people with the surname "Metcalfe"
Justice Metcalf (disambiguation), a disambiguation page for Justices surnamed "Metcalf"
Senator Metcalf (disambiguation), a disambiguation page for Senators surnamed "Metcalf"